Philo Hopkins Olmsted (February 26, 1793 – February 20, 1870) was the eighth mayor and 12th mayor of Columbus, Ohio. He was also the eighth person to serve in that office. He served Columbus for three years during non-consecutive terms. His successor after 1833 was John Brooks and after 1839 was John G. Miller.

References

Bibliography

Further reading

External links
Philo H. Olmsted at Political Graveyard

Mayors of Columbus, Ohio
1793 births
1870 deaths
Ohio Whigs
19th-century American politicians
Burials at Green Lawn Cemetery (Columbus, Ohio)